Çukuryurt may refer to the following places in Turkey:

 Çukuryurt, Eskil
 Çukuryurt, Gercüş
 Çukuryurt, Tercan